Mayumi also known as Mayumi: Virgin Terrorist is a 1990 South Korean film directed by Shin Sang-ok based on the bombing of Korean Air Flight 858. The film was selected as the South Korean entry for the Best Foreign Language Film at the 63rd Academy Awards, but it was not accepted as a nominee.

Plot
Two North Korean agents, carrying Japanese passports bearing the names "Shinichi" and "Mayumi", plan to blow up a Seoul-bound plane in mid-air. They are diverted to another plane after they have planted the bomb. When the plane crashes, killing all on board, the two plan to commit suicide. The man succeeds, but the woman is saved through medical intervention. When she witnesses the suffering of the surviving families of the bombing victims, she begs to be executed, believing it is the only fitting punishment for her actions.

The film is based on the life of Kim Hyon Hui, a North Korean agent whose Japanese teacher was Yaeko Taguchi, a Japanese abductee; she was paroled in 1998, and 12 years later she met Yaeko's son Kochi and told him that his mother was still alive.

Cast
Kim Sora (Kim Seo-ra) as Mayumi
Lee Hak-jae: Shin'ichi
Shin Seong-il 
George Kennedy as Ian Henderson
Reiko Oshida as Yaeko Taguchi
Yoon Il-bong 
Yoon Yang-ha 
Choi Jong-won
Lee Ho-seong 
Choi Yun-seok

See also
List of submissions to the 63rd Academy Awards for Best Foreign Language Film
List of South Korean submissions for the Academy Award for Best Foreign Language Film

Bibliography

References

1990s Korean-language films
South Korean spy films
South Korean action thriller films
Films about terrorism in Asia
Spy films based on actual events
Films set on airplanes
Films about aviation accidents or incidents
Cold War spy films
Films set in North Korea
Films set in Seoul
Films set in Iraq
Films set in Bahrain
Films directed by Shin Sang-ok
Films set in 1987